Jameh Shuran-e Olya (also Romanized as Jāmeh Shūrān-e ‘Olyā and Jameh Shūrān-e ‘Olyā) is a village in Qarah Su Rural District, in the Central District of Kermanshah County, Kermanshah Province, Iran. At the 2006 census, its population was 49, in 8 families.

References 

Populated places in Kermanshah County